"Sit Down" is a song by English band James, originally released in June 1989 by Rough Trade Records. In its eight-and-a-half-minute original form, the song only reached number 77 on the UK Singles Chart (although it did make number eight in John Peel's Festive Fifty of that year).

After experiencing success as part of the Madchester music scene, a new version was released in March 1991 that was shorter and with new lyrics. Released via Fontana Records, it reached number two on the UK Singles Chart, spending three weeks there. It was the 20th best-selling single of 1991 in the UK.

In 2013, the song placed fourth in a poll by BBC Radio 2 and the Official Charts Company to find the greatest track to miss out on the number-one spot in the UK charts. In the same year, James performed the song with Peter Kay for Comic Relief. On 30 March 2017 a version of the song was used in the promo of the seventh season of the hit HBO series Game of Thrones.

Background
The song's lyrics were written in late 1988 as a homage to author Doris Lessing and singer Patti Smith, who had inspired James' lead singer Tim Booth. Booth told the Daily Record in June 2004: "Sit Down is about me feeling so alone in my 20s and reading books by a writer called Doris Lessing which made me realise I wasn't. It was about being awake at 4am and having no-one to talk to."

In a 2014 interview with Dave Simpson of The Guardian on the effect of the song, James guitarist Larry Gott stated, "Sit Down is one of those songs that encourages people to put their arms around strangers. As soon as we launch into the opening bars, they start smiling. Then they turn to someone next to them or their girlfriend or boyfriend and hug them, and then they start singing every single word. As a musician, that's incredibly humbling." The original cover depicts an image of the former Fulham goalkeeper Tony Macedo.

Music videos
The music video for the original 1989 Rough Trade release was directed by Ed Barton. Set against a white background, with Tim Booth singing and the band performing the song. At one point Booth hugs a sheep and various shady-looking individuals sit down next to him. The video received a Musicians Union ban for two weeks, as it featured Jim Glennie impersonating a drummer, and thus taking someone else's job.

Track listings

1989 original release
 "Sit Down" (7-inch and 8:31 extended version on 12-inch)
 "Goin' Away" (12-inch and CD)
 "Sound Investment" (12-inch and CD)
 "Sky Is Falling" (7-inch, 12-inch and CD)

1991 release
 "Sit Down" (new version) (7-inch, 12-inch and CD)
 "Tonight" (12-inch and CD)
 "Sunday Morning" (Canadian CD)
 "Sit Down" (live at G-Mex) (7-inch, 12-inch and CD)

"Sit Down '98"
CD1
 "Sit Down '98" (Apollo 440 remix)
 "Sit Down" (original)
 "China Girl" (Radio One Iggy Pop tribute)

CD2
 "Sit Down '98" (Apollo 440 remix)
 "What For" (Glr Session)
 "Sit Down" (Glr Session)

Charts

Weekly charts
"Sit Down"

"Sit Down '98"

Year-end charts
"Sit Down"

"Sit Down '98"

Certifications

Release history

In popular culture
On 4 June 2017, Coldplay performed "Sit Down" at the One Love Manchester benefit concert for the victims of the Manchester Arena bombing, before performing their song "Fix You". 

Fans of Premier League club Liverpool rewrote the lyrics of this song in 2018 as a new terrace chant for 2017–18 Premier League Golden Boot winner Mohamed Salah. Tim Booth thought the version was witty and welcomed its use for one of the world's best footballers.

References

External links
 One of the Three Single Details
 One of the Three Single Details (1989 Version)

James (band) songs
1989 singles
1989 songs
1991 singles
1998 singles
Fontana Records singles
Rough Trade Records singles
Song recordings produced by Gil Norton